Zadig is a 1747 novella by Voltaire.

Zadig may also refer to:

Fylgia Zadig (1921-1994), Swedish actress
Rebecca Zadig (born 1982), Swedish singer